Dichocarpum is a genus of flowering plants belonging to the family Ranunculaceae.

Its native range is Eastern Himalaya to Japan.

Species
Species:

Dichocarpum adiantifolium 
Dichocarpum arisanense 
Dichocarpum auriculatum 
Dichocarpum basilare 
Dichocarpum carinatum 
Dichocarpum dalzielii 
Dichocarpum dicarpon 
Dichocarpum fargesii 
Dichocarpum franchetii 
Dichocarpum hakonense 
Dichocarpum hypoglaucum 
Dichocarpum nipponicum 
Dichocarpum numajirianum 
Dichocarpum stoloniferum 
Dichocarpum sutchuenense 
Dichocarpum trachyspermum 
Dichocarpum trifoliolatum 
Dichocarpum wuchuanense

References

Ranunculaceae
Ranunculaceae genera